Holy Trinity Barnes is a Church of England church in Castelnau, Barnes, London. Its vicar is David Cooke.

The building dates from 1868. It was designed by Thomas Allom, an architect and artist who lived locally at 1 Barnes Villas (now 80 Lonsdale Road), Barnes.

The church also has a hall.

There are services on Sundays at 10am.

References

External links
Holy Trinity Barnes

1868 in London
1868 establishments in England
19th-century Church of England church buildings
Barnes
Castelnau, London
Barnes
Churches completed in 1868
Churches in Barnes, London